The 1962 Purdue Boilermakers football team was an American football team that represented Purdue University during the 1962 Big Ten Conference football season. In their seventh season under head coach Jack Mollenkopf, the Boilermakers compiled a 4–4–1 record, finished in fifth place in the Big Ten Conference with a 3–3 record against conference opponents, and outscored opponents by a total of 141 to 68.

Notable players from the 1962 Purdue football team included quarterback Ron DiGravio, fullback Roy Walker, end Forest Farmer, and tackle Don Brumm. Brumm was selected as a first-team All-American in 1962 by both the Associated Press and the Football Writers Association of America.

Schedule

References

Purdue
Purdue Boilermakers football seasons
Purdue Boilermakers football